A. Crozer Reeves (December 3, 1867 – February 15, 1936) was an American politician who served in the New Jersey General Assembly in 1925 and in the New Jersey Senate from 1926 to 1936.

References

1867 births
1936 deaths
Majority leaders of the New Jersey Senate
Republican Party members of the New Jersey General Assembly
Republican Party New Jersey state senators
Presidents of the New Jersey Senate